The Montreal International Poetry Prize (also known as The Montreal Prize) is a biennial poetry competition based in Montreal, Quebec, Canada. It was launched in April 2011 during National Poetry Month.

The competition invites online submissions of poems in English from anywhere in the world, and is adjudicated by a board of 10 international editors, which changes every competition, but the winner is selected by a single judge - in 2011, it was former British Poet Laureate Andrew Motion. Subsequent judges have been Don Paterson in 2013, Eavan Boland in 2015, and Michael Harris (poet) in 2017.

The $20,000 (CAD) prize is thought to be the world's largest monetary prize for a single poem.

In addition to the winning poem, the Montreal Prize publishes, with Véhicule Press, the top 50 poems in a printed anthology. The Véhicule Press poetry imprint, Signal Editions published The Global Poetry Anthology in 2011, 2013, 2015, and 2017. In 2011 and 2013 the Montreal Prize produced an electronic longlist anthology. In 2015 the Montreal Prize discontinued the longlist anthology.

The Department of English at McGill University manages the Montreal Prize as of 2018. Yusef Komunyakaa is the judge for the 2020 Montreal Prize.

Winners

References

External links
 New official website
 Old official website

Canadian poetry awards
English-language literary awards
2011 establishments in Quebec
Awards established in 2011
International literary awards